Chamanthedon aurantiibasis is a moth of the family Sesiidae. It is known from eastern Peru.

The length of the forewings is about 7 mm. The legs and palpi are orange yellow and the antennae are brown. The head is black and the thorax black brown with two blue spots and brick-red sides. The abdomen is brick red and the anal tuft wood brown. The forewing basal third is brick red and the median half is hyaline (glass like). The hindwings are hyaline with reddish brown.

References

Sesiidae
Moths described in 1911